The 1979 McEwans Golden Masters was an invitational snooker tournament which took place in May 1979 in Newtownards, Northern Ireland. Similar to the previous year, the tournament featured four professional players - Ray Reardon, Dennis Taylor, Doug Mountjoy and Graham Miles.

Reardon won the title beating Miles 4–2 in the final.

Main draw

References

1979 in snooker
Snooker